Hudson is an unincorporated place and community in the municipality of Sioux Lookout, Kenora District in northwestern Ontario, Canada. It is located on Lost Lake on the English River in the Nelson River drainage basin.

History

Hudson was originally called Rolling Portage and the first post office was established there in 1919.

Transportation
Hudson is on the Canadian National Railway transcontinental main line, between Webster to the west and Pelican to the east, and is passed but not served by Via Rail transcontinental Canadian trains.

It is also the western terminus of Ontario Highway 664, which connects to Ontario Highway 72 southwest of the town centre of Sioux Lookout.

Media

Radio
Hudson is the location of two radio station repeaters: CBLS-FM (Sioux Lookout), a repeater of CBQT-FM, CBC Radio One in Thunder Bay, and CKDR-3, a repeater of CKDR-FM in Dryden.

References

External links
The History of Sioux Lookout & Hudson
Hudson - Explore Northwest Ontario

Communities in Kenora District
Designated places in Ontario